Roohi is a 1981 Indian Hindi-language film directed by S.U. Syed, starring Zarina Wahab and Mazhar Khan.

Plot

Vijay, a wealthy young man who has a wealthy lifestyle as well, lives with his uncle in Delhi. Vijay, a canvas painter  He has a vision paints his dream, the woman he is going to marry on his canvas and takes it along with him to Kandaghat, Himachal Pradesh, to visit a close friend, Prakash. Vijay stays at Prakash's palatial home, which he shares with his girlfriend, Shalu. A few days later Vijay meets a village belle, Sajjo, who looks the same as the image he painted, that of his dream-girl and they fall in love with each other. Vijay calls her 'Roohi'. But Vijay doesn't know that Sajjo has two other passionate admirers, Sangha - who dream of marrying Sajjo at any cost and the second is Prakash himself...Will Vijay-Roohi's love succeeds form the climax.

Songs
"Tuhi Tuhi Meri Roohi" - Suresh Wadkar, Alka Yagnik
"Sajna Mujhko Roohi Kahke Bulaaye" - Asha Bhosle/Alka Yagnik
"Khoobsurat Tera Chehra" - Suresh Wadkar
"Jeete The Jiske Dam Se" - Manhar Udhas
"Badi Der Ki Meherban" - Lata Mangeshkar
"Badi Der Ki Meherban(II)" - Lata Mangeshkar

Cast

Zarina Wahab ... Sajjo / Roohi 
Mazhar Khan ... Vijay 
Asha Sachdev ... Shalu 
Mukesh Khanna ... Prakash
Asif Akbar ... Vijay's uncle 
Sudhir Dalvi ... Rahim 
Uma Dhawan   
Heena Kausar ... Champa - Sajjo's friend 
Mushtaq Merchant   
 Meena Rai ... Devi 'Devi Maa' 
Girja Shankar ... Sangha 
Prithvi Soni

References

External links
 

1981 films
1980s Hindi-language films
Indian action films
1981 action films
Hindi-language action films
Films scored by Manoj–Gyan